Boulenoir, also spelled Boulenouar, is a town and commune in Mauritania, situated on the railway line from Nouadhibou to Zouerate.  Its main resource is water, which is close to the surface. Today the water is bottled and sold. In the 2000 census, the population numbered 1,268.

References

Communes of Mauritania